Midtown Neighborhood Historic District is a national historic district located at St. Charles, St. Charles County, Missouri. The district encompasses 527 contributing buildings, 7 contributing sites, and 5 contributing objects in a predominantly residential section of St. Charles. It developed between about 1838 and 1959, and includes representative examples of Federal, Greek Revival, Gothic Revival, Italianate, Queen Anne, Romanesque Revival, Folk Victorian, Colonial Revival, Classical Revival, Tudor Revival, and Bungalow / American Craftsman style architecture.  Located in the district are the separately listed African Church and Oliver L. and Catherine Link House.  Other notable buildings include the St. Charles County Courthouse, Benton School (1896), St. John's A.M.E. Church (1872), Immanuel Lutheran Church (1867), Jefferson Street Presbyterian Church, Fourth Street Market Grocery (1926-1927), West End Grocery and Meat Market (c. 1900), Dr. Ludwell Powell House (1838), Rogers-Ehrhard House (1856, 1866), Waye Monument Company and Residence (1889), Meyer House, Kaemmerlen House, and Elsner House.

It was added to the National Register of Historic Places in 2014.

References

Historic districts on the National Register of Historic Places in Missouri
Federal architecture in Missouri
Greek Revival architecture in Missouri
Gothic Revival architecture in Missouri
Italianate architecture in Missouri
Queen Anne architecture in Missouri
Romanesque Revival architecture in Missouri
Victorian architecture in Missouri
Colonial Revival architecture in Missouri
Neoclassical architecture in Missouri
Tudor Revival architecture in Missouri
Bungalow architecture in Missouri
Buildings and structures in St. Charles County, Missouri
National Register of Historic Places in St. Charles County, Missouri